Christine Schirrmacher (May 2, 1962) is a German academic who specialises in Islamic studies. She is professor of Islamic studies at the University of Bonn and at the Evangelical Theological Faculty (ETF), Leuven.

Biography 
Christine Schirrmacher studied Islamic studies, history and Modern German literature in Gießen from 1982 to 1985 and Islamic studies, history and comparative religion in Bonn from 1985 to 1988. She graduated with an M.A. in 1988. She then completed her doctoral studies in Bonn, where, in 1991, she obtained her PhD with a thesis on the Christian-Islamic controversy in the 19th and 20th centuries and on the history of the impact of the so-called Gospel of Barnabas. In 2012, in the Department of Islamic Studies at the University of Bonn, she gave a presentation of her thesis on the topic of apostasy and human rights: “‘Let there be no Compulsion in Religion’ (Sura 2:256): Apostasy from Islam as Judged by Contemporary Islamic Theologians: Discourses on Apostasy, Religious Freedom, and Human Rights".

She is professor for Islamic studies at the Institute for Oriental and Asian Studies at the University of Bonn and since 2005 professor of Islamic studies at the Evangelical Theological Faculty (ETF) in Leuven/Belgium. In 2013/2014 she held a professorship at the Institute of Human Geography (focus on political geography and conflict research) at the University of Tübingen, and in 2013 she was appointed substitute professor at the chair of Islamic studies at the University of Erfurt. Since 2007 she has been a guest lecturer at the State and Federal Authorities for Security Policy on an ongoing basis, and since 2001 she has taught annually at the “Akademie Auswärtiger Dienst” (Foreign Service Academy, formerly: Diplomat’s School) of the Federal Foreign Office in Berlin. From 2003 to 2015 she was an associate lecturer in Islamic studies at the “Freie Theologische Hochschule Gießen” (FTH) in Gießen. She is also scientific director of the Institute for Islamic Studies of the German Evangelical Alliance in Germany, Austria and Switzerland and spokesperson and advisor on Islam for the World Evangelical Alliance. In addition, she is a member of the academic advisory board of the Federal Agency for Civic Education (BpB), Bonn/Berlin, a member of the board of trustees of the “German Institute for Human Rights” (DIMR), Berlin, Member of the Academic Advisory Board of the “Academic Council of the Federation of German Criminal Investigators ” (BDK), Berlin, and member of the board of trustees of the “” (EZW) of the Protestant Church (EKD).

Guest lectures, as well as study and lecture tours, took her to numerous Islamic countries. Schirrmacher is involved in leading dialogue initiatives (as of 2017) such as letters of response to the “Open Letter from 138 Muslim theologians to the leaders of Christian churches” and at the invitation of the Yale Center for Faith and Culture of Yale University as well as at the follow-up conference “Loving God and Neighbor in Word and Deed: Implications for Muslims and Christians” or the “Berlin Forum for Progressive Muslims” (2011; 2013), a symposium of the Friedrich Ebert Foundation. She has also served as an expert for the Human Rights and Humanitarian Aid Committee of the German Bundestag.

One of the findings of the Institute of Islamic Studies she heads (as of 2007) is that no Islamic country today grants Christians real religious freedom. Rather, they would be socially discriminated against and harassed in numerous states. Those who convert from Islam to Christianity are sometimes even threatened with death (see Apostasy in Islam). Europe is also facing new challenges in the age of globalisation and migration. This also includes the preservation of religious freedom as “a trademark of Europe” (Tom Königs) within the framework of the liberal-democratic basic order. However, anyone who fights against them cannot claim freedom of religion for this.

Works

Books (selection) 
 .
 .
 .
 .
 .
 .
 .
 .
 .

Articles (selection) 
 .
 .
 .
 .

References

External links 
 .

German Islamic studies scholars
Living people
1962 births